Look for a Star is a 2009 Hong Kong romantic comedy film that was produced and directed by Andrew Lau. Inspired by the relationship between Stanley Ho and his fourth wife, Angela Leong, the film stars Andy Lau as a billionaire, who falls in love with a feisty casino dealer played by Shu Qi. Look for a Star was shot at the MGM Grand in Macau, and was released in Hong Kong on 26 January 2009.

Plot 
It is love at first sight when Sam (Andy Lau) chances upon a feisty, fast-talking woman with the odd name of Milan (Shu Qi) at a Macau casino. But the catch is, she is a part-time baccarat dealer and a full-time cabaret dancer, "careers" not exactly congruent with his station in life. Falling in love against all odds, this mismatched couple soon makes headline in all media turning Milan into an It girl overnight.

Cast

Production
Look for a Star is a Hong Kong and Chinese co-production that marks the sixth collaboration between producer, director, and cinematographer Andrew Lau and Cantopop singer and actor Andy Lau. It is also the second film collaboration between Andy Lau and actress Shu Qi. Both actors and the director worked together on the 2002 science fiction action film, The Wesley's Mysterious File, although Andy Lau had expressed wanting to make a romantic comedy with Shu.

Look for a Star was distributed by Media Asia Entertainment Group in Hong Kong and produced by Media Asia, Chinese film studio Huayi Brothers, and Andrew Lau's production company, Basic Pictures.  Shot under a budget of HK$45 million, the film is reportedly based on the relationship between casino tycoon Stanley Ho and his fourth wife, Angela Leong.

Filming
Look for a Star was supported by the Macau Government Tourist Office, and shot at the MGM Grand Macau, best known for its spectacular Grande Praca swimming pool and deluxe villa suites.  Other filming locations included Macau's Southern European architecture, including the Old Ladies House, the Guia Lighthouse and the Coloane village.

Accolades

References

External links 
 
 

2009 films
2009 romantic comedy films
Hong Kong romantic comedy films
Media Asia films
Basic Pictures films
2000s Cantonese-language films
Films directed by Andrew Lau
Films set in Macau
Films shot in Macau
2000s Hong Kong films